Jeffery Lee Rodenberger (born November 3, 1959) is a former American football fullback and tight end who played for the Philadelphia/Baltimore Stars and New Orleans Saints between 1983 and 1987.

Early life and education
Jeff Rodenberger was born on November 3, 1959 in Quakertown, Pennsylvania and attended Quakertown High School.

College
Rodenberger went to Maryland for college, where he played fullback. In his career, he made 57 rushes for 205 yards and eight catches for 61 yards.

Professional career

USFL
Rodenberger was originally signed by the Philadelphia Stars. He was later picked in the Houston Gamblers expansion draft, but was brought back to the Stars with some draft picks. He was converted to play tight end in the USFL. He played in 18 games in 1983 and in 1984. He also played in 1985. In his USFL career, he had 36 rushes for 173 yards and one touchdown.

NFL
After not playing in 1986, he played as a replacement player for the New Orleans Saints in 1987. He had 17 rushes for 35 yards in his 3 games. He did not play afterwards.

References

1959 births
Living people
American football fullbacks
American football tight ends
Maryland Terrapins football players
Philadelphia Stars players
New Orleans Saints players
Players of American football from Pennsylvania
People from Quakertown, Pennsylvania
21st-century African-American people